Orison may refer to:

 An archaic word for prayer
 Orison Rudolph Aggrey (1926-2016), United States Ambassador to Senegal, Gambia and Romania
 Orison Whipple Hungerford, Jr., birth name of American actor Ty Hardin (born 1930)
 Orison Swett Marden (1850-1924), American writer
 Orison S. Marden (lawyer) (1896-1975), American lawyer, president of the American Bar Association
 "Orison" (The X-Files), an episode of The X-Files
 A futuristic recording device in the novel Cloud Atlas by David Mitchell

See also
 Orissus or Orisson, third-century BC king of the Oretani people in Iberia